William Moorlag (born 17 April 1960) is a Dutch politician of the Labour Party. He has been a member of the House of Representatives since 25 October 2017. He was a member of the States of Groningen in 2003, member of the Provincial-Executive from 2003 to 2015.

References

External links 
 
 William Moorlag (in Dutch) at the website of the House of Representatives
 William Moorlag (in Dutch) at the website of the Labour Party

1960 births
Dutch politicians
Labour Party (Netherlands) politicians
Living people
Members of the House of Representatives (Netherlands)
People from Bedum